Frédéric Samuel Cordey (1854–1911) was a French landscape painter who was a part of the Impressionist movement. He was a close friend of Auguste Renoir, and had a personal fortune that allowed him to work according to his taste, regardless of the publicity and support provided by art dealers.

Life and work 

A student of Isidore Pils and Gustave Boulanger, Cordey was part of a group that revolted against the teachings of his teachers with his friend Pierre Franc Lamy. Cordey quickly abandoned traditional painting to follow the path of the Impressionists and exhibited four paintings Rue à Montmartre ("Street in Montmartre"), Le Pont des Saints-Pères ("Bridge at Saints-Pères"), le Séchoir ("The Dryer", Chantilly), Pêcheur ("Fisherman", sketch) with them in 1877.

In 1881, Gustave Caillebotte informed Camille Pissarro that he wanted Cordey to exhibit with the Impressionists, but that year Cordey was in Algiers with André Lhote. Cordey exhibited his work at the Salon des indépendants in 1884.

Cordey was close to Renoir and was one of his most loyal companions. Cordey appeared in several paintings by the master painter, for example, the Bal du moulin de la galette ("Dance at Le moulin de la Galette") and La Conversation ("The Conversation"). Auguste Renoir's son, Jean, reported a theory of Cordey's which appealed a lot to his father: "Painters, like gymnasts, must keep in shape. They must keep a clear sight, precise movements, and good legs to go meet the landscape."

Cordey was a great admirer of the musician François Cabaner. To help him as he was poor and dying, Cordey (like other artists) gave one of his works, to be auctioned and raise funds. Paul Cézanne mentioned the list of the offered works in a letter to his friend Émile Zola. He also admired Nina de Callias and Léon Dierx, whose portraits he drew. Cordey's painting Léon Dierx, prince des poètes ("Léon Dierx, prince of poets") was purchased by Georges Viau in 1899.

Attentive to landscapes, he stayed close to Camille Pissarro in Neuville-sur-Oise and Éragny. He participated in the Salon d'automne from its inception in 1903 until 1908. He was named a member of the Salon in 1904, where he exhibited six of his paintings.

Cordey exhibited ten paintings at the Salon in 1906, including six of the banks of the Oise. He exhibited rarely, however, the art critics Adolphe Tabarant, Paul Alexis, and Gustave Geffroy were very eulogistic in the preface to the retrospective exhibition of Cordey in 1913-1914 at Choiseul Gallery. Adolphe Thalasso praised Cordey's landscapes from Eragny in a February 1914 report in L'Art et les Artistes ("Art and Artists").

Gallery

Selected works 

 1877 – Auditoire captivé ("A captive audience")
 1879 – Madame Cordey faisant de la tapisserie ("Mrs Cordey making a tapestry")
 1879 – Jeune femme lisant ("Young woman reading")
 1881 – Femme orientale au sofa ("Eastern woman on a sofa")
 1889 – Autoportrait ("Self-portrait")
 1892 – Les toits, le matin ("The roof, the morning")
 1892 – La basse-cour ("The barnyard")
 1893 – Vue d'Eragny-Neuville ("View of Eragny-Neuville")
 1894 – Passage à niveau ("Crossing")
 1894 – Le Garde Barrière ("The guard barrier")
 1895 – Bord de rivière ("Riverside")
 1895 – Paysage aux meules ("Landscape with wheels")
 1896 – Bord de rivière ("Riverside")
 1898 – Paysage avec l'église ("Landscape with church")
 1898 – Chrysanthèmes blanches dans un vase ("White chrysanthemums in a vase")
 1898 – Le chemin vers le château ("The road to the castle")
 1900 – Cerisiers en fleurs aux environs d'Auvers sur Oise ("Cherry blossoms around Auvers-sur-Oise")
 1900 – Les Péniches ("The houseboat")
 1901 – A l'orée du bois ("At the edge of the woods")
 1903 – Bord de l'Oise ("Bank of the Oise")
 1903 – Bord de l'Oise en automne ("Oise waterfront in autumn")
 1903 – Peupliers au bord de la rivière ("Poplars on the banks of the river")
 1905 – Femme pensive ("Pensive woman")
 1906 – Plat de Pêches ("Plate of peaches")
 1906 – Les environs de Pontoise ("The area around Pontoise")
 Ruelle à Auvers-sur-Oise ("Lane in Auvers-sur-Oise")
 Les Chaumes du gré à Auvers sur Oise ("Shrubs in Auvers-sur-Oise")

Exhibitions 

 1877 – Exhibited a single painting with the Impressionists
 1887 – Salon des indépendants
 1903 – Salon d'Automne
 1904 – Salon d'Automne
 1905 – Salon d'Automne
 1906 – Salon d'Automne: Plat de pêches ("Plate of peaches") and nine other canvases, of which six depict the banks of the Oise
 1907 – Salon d'Automne
 1908 – dernière exposition au Salon d'Automne

Gallery exhibitions 

Choiseul Gallery, Frederick Samuel Cordey, Winter 1913-1914

Honors 

1904 – Associate of the Salon d'Automne

Notes

References 

 Adolphe Thalasso, Frédéric Samuel Cordey in L'Art et les artistes ("Art and artists"), February 1914, report on exhibition in Choiseul Gallery
 Collection: Les Peintres de l'Oise ("Painters of the Oise"), in the exhibition catalog of Talvet-Delacour Museum in Pontoise, 2007
 Dictionnaire des peintres à Montmartre au au XIXe et XXe siècles ("Dictionary of painters in Montmartre in the nineteenth and twentieth centuries"); 640p, 4285 biographies
 Claire et Paul Pfisterer, Signaturelexikon ("Dictionary signatures"), Eds. Walter de Gruyter & Co., April 1999
 Christophe Duvivier,  Les peintres et l'Oise, les peintres-graveurs de la Vallée de l'Oise ("Painters from Oise, painters and engravers from Oise valley")
 Sophie Monneret, L'Impressionnisme et son époque ("Impressionism and time"), Vol. 1, Paris, Robert Laffont, 1987, p. 997, 
 Sophie Monneret, L'Impressionnisme et son époque ("Impressionism and time"), Vol. 2, Paris, Robert Laffont, 1987, p. 1185, 

19th-century French painters
French male painters
20th-century French painters
20th-century French male artists
French Impressionist painters
French landscape painters
1854 births
1911 deaths
19th-century French male artists